The Virus Pathogen Database and Analysis Resource (ViPR)  is an integrative and comprehensive publicly available database and analysis resource to search, analyze, visualize, save and share data for viral pathogens in the U.S. National Institute of Allergy and Infectious Diseases (NIAID) Category A-C Priority Pathogen lists for biodefense research, and other viral pathogens causing emerging/reemerging infectious diseases. ViPR is one of the five Bioinformatics Resource Centers (BRC) funded by NIAID, a component of the National Institutes of Health (NIH), which is an agency of the United States Department of Health and Human Services.

Virus families covered in ViPR

The ViPR database includes genomes from these viral families: Arenaviridae, Bunyaviridae, Caliciviridae, Coronaviridae, Filoviridae, Flaviviridae, Hepeviridae, Herpesviridae, Paramyxoviridae, Picornaviridae, Poxviridae, Reoviridae, Rhabdoviridae, and Togaviridae.

Data types in ViPR 
 Genomes
 Genome annotations
 Genes & proteins
 Predicted protein domains and motifs
 Immune epitopes
 Sequence Features 
 Orthologous protein clusters
 3D protein structure
 Clinical metadata
 Host factor data

Analysis and visualization tools in ViPR 
 BLAST: provides a variety of custom ViPR databases to identify the most related sequence(s)
 Short Peptide Search: allows users to find any peptide sequence using exact, fuzzy, or pattern matching
 Sequence Variation Analysis ([Single-nucleotide polymorphism] SNP): calculates sequence variation existing in the specified sequences
 Metadata-driven Comparative Analysis Tool for Sequences (Meta-CATS): an automated comparative statistical analysis to identify positions throughout a multiple sequence alignment that significantly differ between groups of sequences possessing specific phenotypic characteristic
 Multiple Sequence Alignment: aligns small genomes, gene/protein sequences or large viral genome sequences using one of several algorithm best-suited for the specific job submission
 Sequence Alignment Visualization: uses JalView for sequence alignment visualization
 Phylogenetic Tree Generation: calculates a tree using one of several available algorithms and evolutionary models
 Phylogenetic Tree Visualization: allows the color-coded display of strain metadata on a tree using the Archaeopteryx viewer
 GBrowse: provides genome browsing capability for large DNA viral genomes (Herpesviridae and Poxviridae) with integration of ViPR Sequence Features for Vaccinia virus
 Sequence Feature Variant Type (SFVT) analysis: provides a centralized repository of functional regions and automatically calculates all observed sequence variation within each defined region
 3D Protein Structure Visualization: integrates PDB protein structure files with ViPR Sequence Features when applicable and provides an interactive 3D protein structure viewer using Jmol
 Genome Annotator (GATU): allows users to annotate new genome sequences provided by the user
 Genotype Determination and Recombination Detection: predicts the genotype for user-provided sequences and identifies possible sites of recombination for viruses in the family Flaviviridae
 PCR Primer Design: allows the user to automatically predict ideal primers based on a sequence and specified parameters
 ReadSeq: converts between various sequence formats
 Sequence Feature Submission Tool: allows users to define a Sequence Feature by filling out a webform
 External Analysis Tools: displays a list and description of third-party tools for more specialized analyses
 Personal Workbench to save and share data and analysis

References

External links
 
 Bioinformatics Resource Centers The NIAID page describing the goals and activities of the BRCs

Biological databases
Pathogen genomics